Bottidda is a comune (municipality) in the Province of Sassari in the Italian region Sardinia, located about  north of Cagliari and about  southeast of Sassari.

Bottidda borders the following municipalities: Bono, Bonorva, Burgos, Esporlatu, Illorai, Orotelli.

References

External links 

 Official website

Cities and towns in Sardinia